Everton Jay Lawrence (February 23, 1877 – June 19, 1947) was an American football player and coach. Lawrence was born in Norwalk, Ohio and played college football at Williams College from 1900 to 1901, before graduating in 1902. He served as the head football coach at Western Reserve University—now known as Case Western Reserve University, during the 1903 college football season, compiling a 3–6 record.

Lawrence married Julia Frances Klumph.

Head coaching record

References

External links
 

1877 births
1947 deaths
American football guards
American football halfbacks
Case Western Spartans football coaches
Williams Ephs football players
People from Norwalk, Ohio